Markus Mader (born 21 May 1968) is an Austrian football manager and former player. He currently coaches SC Austria Lustenau.

Career
Mader played for different clubs in Vorarlberg. With IG Bregenz/Dornbirn he played in the Second League. 

After the end of his player career he became manager of different clubs in Vorarlberg. In the 2017/18, season he became coach of FC Dornbirn in the Regionalliga. With the club he was promoted 2019 to the Second League. In 2019/20 they finished 12th, and 7th in 2020/21. For the 2021/22 season, he became coach of Austria Lustenau. The won the league and were promoted to the Austrian Football Bundesliga for the first time in 22 years.

Honours
Austria Lustenau
2. Liga: 2021–22

References

External links
 OEFB Profile

1977 births
Living people
Austrian footballers
Austrian football managers
Association football forwards
2. Liga (Austria) players
Austrian Regionalliga players
Austrian Football Bundesliga managers
SC Austria Lustenau managers